Monsieur Vincent is a 1947 French film about Vincent de Paul. In 1949, it won an honorary Academy Award as the best foreign language film released in the United States in 1948. The Vatican placed it amongst their list of approved films under the category of Religion due to its thematic nature in 1995. Pierre Fresnay portrayed Vincent.

Plot 
The film depicts the life of Vincent de Paul, the 17th-century priest and charity worker. It depicts his struggle to help the poor in the face of obstacles, such as the Black Death.

Cast 
 Pierre Fresnay : Vincent de Paul, priest
 Aimé Clariond : Cardinal Richelieu
 Jean Debucourt : Philippe-Emmanuel de Gondi, Count of Joigny
 Lise Delamare : Françoise Marguerite de Silly, Madame de Gondi
 Germaine Dermoz : Queen Anne of Austria
 Gabrielle Dorziat : President Goussault
 Pierre Dux : Chancellor Séguier
 Yvonne Gaudeau : Louise de Marillac
 Jean Carmet : Father Portail
 Michel Bouquet : Tuberculosis sufferer
 Gabrielle Fontan : The elder deaf woman of the presbytery of Châtillon
 Robert Murzeau : Monsieur Besnier
 Gabriel Gobin : A servant of Monsieur Besnier
 Claude Nicot : A page of M. Besnier
 Marcel Pérès : La Pogne, crippled former soldier
 Francette Vernillat : The little girl
 Georges Vitray : The Count of Châtillon
 Véra Norman : Mademoiselle de Châtillon, the Count's daughter
 Geneviève Morel : Marguerite Naseau
 Ginette Gaubert : One of the lady benefactresses
 Renée Thorel : One of the lady benefactresses
 Marcel Vallée : The administrator of the hospices
 Paul Demange : A sacristan with foundling children
 Paul Faivre : A sacristan with foundling children
 Guy Favières : A bastard beggar / Poor man near the fireplace
 André Dumas : Cardinal Graziani
 Jeanne Hardeyn : Madeleine, a sister of charity 
 Joëlle Janin : Jeanne, the young novice sister
 Maurice Marceau : A poor man
 Maximilienne : A devotee to the church
 Marthe Mellot : The old woman who overeats
 Alice Reichen : The landlady
 Nicole Riche : The landlady's daughter
 Jean Rougerie : A poor man
 René Stern : An abbot with Madame de Gondi
 Charles Gérard : A convict
 Georges Cerf
 Yvonne Claudie
 Jean Favre-Bertin
 Harry-Max
 Robert Le Béal
 Max Rogerys
 Tony Taffin
 Jean-Marc Tennberg
 Victor Vina

Production
Guy Lefranc was assistant director on the movie.

Awards
 1947 : Pierre Fresnay wins Volpi Cup for Best Actor at Venice Film Festival
 1947 : The film wins the Grand prix of French Cinema
 1947 : Nominated for Golden Lion for Maurice Cloche
 1949 : Oscar for Best Foreign Language Film
 1949 : Nominated for the British Academy Film Awards for best film
 1949 : Prize for the best film awarded by the Belgian film press
 1950 : Nominated at Golden Globes for Golden Globe Award for Promoting International Understanding

References

External links

1940s historical films
Films set in the 17th century
French historical films
1947 films
Films awarded an Academy Honorary Award
Best Foreign Language Film Academy Award winners
Films about Catholicism
1940s French-language films
Films about Catholic priests
Films about infectious diseases
French black-and-white films
Films directed by Maurice Cloche
Films about the Black Death
1940s French films
Cultural depictions of Cardinal Richelieu